St. Colman's High and Sixth Form College is a co-educational secondary school situated in Ballynahinch, County Down, Northern Ireland.

History
The college was established in 1965 as St. Colman's Secondary School.  As it grew in size and the range of courses offered its name was changed to St. Colman's High and Sixth Form College. 
Although the college is formally Catholic it welcomes students from many different faiths including Baptist, Church of Ireland, Congregational, Methodist, Presbyterian, Seventh Day Adventist and other Christian Churches.

Academics
The school provides instruction in a range of academic subjects besides the core subjects English, Maths and Science. At Key Stage 3 these include 
Geography, Drama, Technology & Design, ICT, History, Home Economics, Music, Irish, Art & Design, Spanish. At Sixth form level, students have a wide range of options including Agriculture & Land Use, Business, Computing, Art & Design, Biology, Chemistry, Drama, Economics, English Literature, French, Irish, Spanish, Maths, Geography, Government & Politics, Psychology, Sociology and Religious Studies. Some of these options are taken in conjunction with Assumption Grammar School.

The students can also take BTECs in Applied Science, Construction, Horticulture and Vehicle Technology.

In 2018, the college was placed in the top ten of non-selective schools in Northern Ireland with 92% of Year 12 students securing at least 5 A* to C grades and 82% of Year 12 securing Grade C or above in 7 subjects.

The college is a member of the Ballynahinch Area Learning Community, a consortium of local schools.

Principals
 Mr Harry Bent
 Mr Hugh Graham
 Mr Francis Duffy
 Mr Hugh McCann
 Mr Mark Morgan

See also
 List of secondary schools in Northern Ireland

References  

Secondary schools in Northern Ireland